The Roman Catholic Archdiocese of Cotabato is a metropolitan archdiocese of the Latin Church of the Catholic Church on the island of Mindanao, the Philippines. The Archdiocese includes North Cotabato (also known as the P-PALMA area) and the municipality of Banisilan, Cotabato.

Its seat is the Cathedral of the Immaculate Conception in Cotabato City. The Archbishop's Palace is at 158 Sinsuat Avenue, Rosary Heights, Cotabato City.

Its current archbishop is Angelito Lampon, O.M.I, following the retirement of Orlando Cardinal Quevedo, whose resignation was accepted by Pope Francis on 6 November 2018. He was installed on January 31, 2019.

History 
On 11 August 1950, the Territorial Prelature of Cotabato and Sulu was formed out of the Roman Catholic Diocese of Zamboanga.  The Territorial prelature included the three provinces of North Cotabato, Sultan Kudarat and Maguindanao.

On 28 October 1953 it was renamed Territorial Prelature of Cotabato when it lost territory to the new the Apostolic Prefecture of Sulu.  It lost territory again on 17 December 1960 to establish the Territorial Prelature of Marbel.

On 5 November 1979, Pope John Paul II elevated the Diocese of Cotabato into Metropolitan Archdiocese of Cotabato.

Ordinaries

Metropolitan Archbishops

Auxiliary bishops

Province 
Its ecclesiastical province comprises the Metropolitan's own archbishopric and the suffragan dioceses of Kidapawan and Marbel.

Religious Congregations in the Archdiocese 
Men
Oblates of Mary Immaculate
Society of Mary or Marist Fathers
Little Brothers of Mary or Marist Brothers
Women
Oblates of Notre Dame
Religious of the Virgin Mary
Siervas de la Nuestra Senora dela Paz
Dominican Sisters of Saint Catherine of Siena
Religious des Notre Dame de Missions
Carmelite Sisters of Charity
Associates of Notre Dame
Xaverian Missionaries of Christ Jesus with missions in Pastoral and Social Services in the Sanitarium and Provincial Jail in Cotabato and in Langgal, Senator Ninoy Aquino, Sultan Kudarat Province.

See also 
 Roman Catholicism in the Philippines

References

External links 
 
 GCatholic, with incumbent bio links
 Catholic Hierarchy

Cotobato
Archdiocese
Christian organizations established in 1950
Roman Catholic dioceses and prelatures established in the 20th century
Roman Catholic Archdiocese of Cotabato
1950 establishments in the Philippines
Religion in Cotabato
Cotabato City